Yerlisu is a Turkish surname. Notable people with the surname include:

Gülnur Yerlisu (born 1968), Turkish taekwondo practitioner, sister of Tennur
Tennur Yerlisu (born 1966), Turkish taekwondo practitioner and coach

See also
 Yerlisu, Keşan

Turkish-language surnames